Yue He is a fictional character in Water Margin, one of the Four Great Classical Novels in Chinese literature. Nicknamed "Iron Whistle", he ranks 77th among the 108 Stars of Destiny and 41st among the 72 Earthly Fiends.

Background
The novel depicts Yue He, a native of Maozhou (茅州; present-day Changyi, Shandong),  as good-looking. Talented in music, he could play many kinds of instruments and sing well. He is also skilled in martial arts and makes a good spy. His sister is married to Sun Li, the garrison commandant of Dengzhou (登州; in present-day eastern Shandong).

Becoming an outlaw
One day Yue He, a jailer in the Dengzhou prison, is put in charge of the new prisoners Xie Zhen and Xie Bao. The hunter brothers have been arrested for smashing up the house of one Squire Mao after failing to find a tiger they shot that had fallen into the old man's garden. In fact the squire and his son had sent the tiger to the prefecture office to claim reward.

Yue He sympathises with the brothers, knowing they would be murdered in prison. Besides, he is related to the Xies, his brother-in-law Sun Li being the brother-in-law of Gu Dasao, a cousin of the hunters. Gu's husband is Sun Xin, Sun Li's younger brother.

Yue He takes the news about the Xies to Gu Dasao and Sun Xin, who pressure Sun Li to join in their rescue plan. They also involve the bandits Zou Yuan and Zou Run. Yue He lets Gu Dasao, who pretends to be sending food to the Xies, into the jail. He then frees the brothers who are locked on a stone bed while Gu causes commotion in the compound. Meanwhile Sun Li breaks into the prison with the rest. After pulling off the rescue, the group kill the Mao family and flee to join the outlaws of Liangshan Marsh.

Before going up to the stronghold, Sun Li volunteers to infiltrate the Zhu Family Manor, which Liangshan has failed to take in two offensives. As Sun Li has learnt combat from the same teacher as Luan Tingyu, the martial arts instructor of the manor, he wins the confidence of the Zhus. Yue He, together with Gu Dasao, Sun Xin, Zou Yuan, Zou Run and the Xie brothers, goes on a rampage inside the manor, taking it by surprise, when Sun Li gives his signal. The fall of the Zhu Family Manor is a huge contribution by the group before their acceptance into Liangshan.

Campaigns
Yue He is appointed as one of Liangshan's scout leaders after the 108 Stars of Destiny came together in what is called the Grand Assembly. When Grand Marshal Gao Qiu attacks Liangshan with a massive military force, he is defeated and captured. But the outlaws free him after he promised to help them secure amnesty from Emperor Huizong. Yue He and Xiao Rang go with Gao to the capital Dongjing as Liangshan's representatives to meet the emperor. However, Gao detains them in his residence and reneges on his promise. Yan Qing and Dai Zong later break into Gao's house and save the two.

The outlaws eventually receive amnesty due to help from the courtesan Li Shishi and other court officials. Emperor Huizong sends them on military campaigns against the Liao invaders and other rebel forces on Song territory to atone for their crimes. Yue He participates in the first three expeditions.

Before the fourth starts, which targets the rebel Fang La, the emperor summons Yue He back to Dongjing. It turns out that a prince consort has heard of Yue He's musical talent and wants him to be his minstrel. Yue spends the rest of his life in the house of the prince.

References
 
 
 
 
 
 
 

72 Earthly Fiends
Fictional prison officers and governors
Fictional characters from Shandong